Three Sides of One is the thirteenth studio album by American rock band King's X, released on September 2, 2022, through Inside Out Music. It is their first studio album in fourteen years, since 2008's XV, marking the longest gap between two studio albums in their career.

Background
While work on Three Sides of One began as early as 2010, years of slow progress had ensued due to each member of the band focusing on his respective solo or side projects. The album's progress was also sidelined by health issues involving the members, with drummer Jerry Gaskill suffering a heart attack on two occasions, and bassist and vocalist Doug Pinnick diagnosed with a lymph node infection. By 2015, Gaskill and Pinnick had recovered from their respective health issues, and in June of that year, Pinnick told Eddie Trunk that King's X was "committed to a new record" but was unsure of when the band would enter the studio to record it.

In August 2018, Pinnick announced that King's X had "officially decided" to make the follow-up to XV, explaining, "We had a meeting with our manager, and we said, 'Okay. It's a go. Move forward.' So that's the next thing. He's gotta work the contract out, the logistics of where to make the record, who's gonna produce it, where we're gonna stay, how we're gonna do it, how we're gonna rehearse before, how we're gonna go there and write together, how we're gonna bring songs in — how we're gonna do it. So that's the next step. But it's getting done. And that's a good thing. Before, it was just talk for years and years and years. Now we have a commitment. I'll see how long that lasts, but I'm waiting." In October of that year, it was announced that the band had signed to the Australian independent record label, Golden Robot Records, who had planned to release their thirteenth studio album in the U.S, Australia and Europe sometime in 2019; within the next few years, however, the album would face myriad delays, due to COVID-related manufacturing issues as well as the slow pace of the band working on new material.

In April 2022, it was reported that the album had been mastered, and a month later, King's X had signed to Inside Out/Sony Music and announced that the then-still-untitled record would be released on September 2, 2022. The band revealed Three Sides of One as the album's title on June 24, 2022 and its lead single "Let It Rain" was released on the same day. The album's second single, "Give It Up", was released on July 27. The third single, "All God's Children", was released on August 26.

Reception
Three Sides of One reached #10 on the USA Current Album Sales Chart, #2 on USA Current Hard Music Albums Chart, #3 on USA Current Rock Albums Chart, #21 on UK Vinyl Chart, #15 on UK Physical Albums Chart, and #21 on German Albums Chart, making it one of the most globally successful albums  of the band's career. Classic Rock Magazine gave it a 3.5 out of 5 rating and called it "Classy, intelligent, sonically powerful stuff", BraveWords gave it a 8 out 10 rating and called the band "Masters of their craft, to be sure, just as they were in 1988 at the start of their career", and Sonic Perspectives gave it a 8.9 out of 10 rating and said "The marvel of Three Sides of One is you get the three unique voices and playing that converge into one glorious sound".

Track listing

Personnel
Doug Pinnick – bass, lead vocals
Ty Tabor – guitar, vocals
Jerry Gaskill – drums, vocals

Charts

References

2022 albums
King's X albums
Inside Out Music albums
Sony Music albums